Mellachervu mandal is one of the 23 mandals in Suryapet district of the Indian state of Telangana. It is under the administration of Kodad revenue division with its headquarters at Mellachervu. It is bounded by Mattampally mandal towards west, Huzurnagar mandal towards North, Mallareddygudem mandal towards South, Krishna district of Andhra Pradesh towards East.

Demographics
Mellachervu mandal is having a population of 38,140 . Yepalamadhavaram is the smallest Village and Mellachervu is the biggest Village in the mandal.

Villages 
 census of India, the mandal has 4 settlements.
The settlements in the mandal are listed below:

Notes
(†) Mandal headquarter

References

Mandals in Suryapet district